Huron Wind is the first commercial wind farm in Ontario.  It is located in the village of Inverhuron, Ontario near Tiverton, and consists of 5 Vestas V80-1.8MW wind turbines.  It is next to the Bruce Power Visitor Centre, within sight of the Bruce Nuclear Generating Station, and adjacent to the larger Enbridge Ontario Wind Farm.  Groundbreaking was on July 11, 2002, and it was declared officially in service on December 1, 2002.

The project is owned by a consortium of BPC Generation Infrastructure Trust, Cameco Corporation and TransCanada PipeLines Limited.

See also

List of wind farms in Canada

References

External links
 Official Huron Wind site

Buildings and structures in Bruce County
Wind farms in Ontario